Rajnesh Wellington (born Jude Plascidus Rajnesh Wellington on 5 October 1968) was a Sri Lankan cricketer. He was a right-handed batsman and a right-arm off-break bowler who played for the Tamil Union Cricket and Athletic Club. He was born in Watara.

Wellington made a single first-class appearance for the side, during the 1988–89 season, against Galle Cricket Club. From the lower order, he scored 16 runs in the only innings in which he batted.

External links
Rajnesh Wellington at CricketArchive 

1968 births
Living people
Sri Lankan cricketers
Tamil Union Cricket and Athletic Club cricketers